The Smugglers Inn is a British styled pub in Stanley, on the south side of Hong Kong Island.

Named after the smugglers that used to inhabit Stanley ('Chek Chue', the Cantonese name for Stanley, literally translates as "Bandit's post"), the Smugglers Inn has something of a pirate theme to it with wooden beams across the ceiling and tables and stools made from old barrels.  Amongst other things it serves a wide range of beers as well as basic pub food, such as sandwiches and pies.

Over the years the Smugglers Inn has proved popular with both tourists and expats alike and become renowned for its friendly atmosphere and picturesque setting on the Stanley waterfront.

The Smugglers Inn is renowned to host the best dart players in the Expat and local communities competing for free drinks.  In the event the dart games are not enough of a competition, foot races across the harbor front have been known to be run for free drinks.

Stanley, Hong Kong